A freezie or a freeze pop is a water-based frozen confection similar to an ice pop. It is made by freezing flavored liquid such as sugar water, fruit juice or purée inside a plastic casing or tube, either round or flat. Since freezies come in plastic sleeves, unlike ice pops, they do not require refrigeration. They also do not need to be frozen as solidly as a popsicle and can have a consistency similar to that of a slushie. Freezies are sold in a variety of flavors, including cherry, orange, lemon-lime, watermelon, cream soda, blue raspberry, and grape.

Name 
Freezies go by a variety of different names in different regions. The name freezie itself is most commonly used in Canada. Other regional names include freeze pop, freezer pop and Icee in the United States, ice pole and ice pop in the United Kingdom, icy pole in Australia, sip up and Pepsi ice in India, and ice candy in the Philippines. Names used in non-English speaking countries include bolis in Mexico and Colombia, chup or marciano in Peru, chup-chup, sacolé, dindim and geladinho in Brazil, shlukim in Israel, and aiskrim Malaysia in Malaysia.

The name of the prominent brand of freezies are also commonly used as a generic term for freezies in the region. Examples include Otter Pop, Fla-Vor-Ice, and Pop-Ice in the United States, Zooper Dooper in Australia, and Mr. Freeze in the United Kingdom and Canada.

History 
The first brand to introduce the concept of freezies to the United States was Pop-Ice, which was acquired by Jel Sert in 1963. 6 years later in 1969, Jel Sert launched its own brand of freezies called Fla-Vor-Ice, which quickly gained popularity and became the company's best-selling brand. Otter Pops was founded in the 1970s and grew to dominate the west coast freezie market. In 1996, the company was acquired by Jel Sert, making Jel Sert the largest supplier of freezies in the United States.

In Canada, freezies have been made by Kisko under the Mr. Freeze brand since 1977 when the company started producing them in the Toronto region after the business was relocated from Kingston, Jamaica.

Brands 
The freezies market is composed of many prominent regional brands with no brands having a large global reach. In the United States, prominent brands of freezies include Fla-Vor-Ice, Otter Pops, Pop-Ice, all three of which are made by Jel Sert. Other prominent brands include Mr. Freeze, produced by Kisko, in Canada, Zooper Dooper in Australia, Bon Ice in Mexico, Calippo in the British Isles and Australasia, and Polaretti in Italy.

References

Snack foods
Ice-based desserts